The Sannio Hills are a chain of hills located in the province of Benevento, Campania, southern Italy.

The Sannio hills have long been considered a particularly fertile zone of Italy. The ancient Greeks knew this region as a land for growing olives. Today a variety of crops are grown besides olives. The Sannio Hills are also known for producing grapes under the Sannio name, from which several fine wines are made.

Landforms of Campania
Hills of Italy